The 2014 South Carolina gubernatorial election took place on November 4, 2014, to elect the Governor of South Carolina, concurrently with the regularly-scheduled election and special election to both of South Carolina's U.S. Senate seats, as well as other elections to the United States Senate in other states and elections to the United States House of Representatives and various state and local elections.

Incumbent Republican Governor Nikki Haley ran for re-election to a second term in office. She faced Democratic State Senator Vincent Sheheen in the general election. Republican-turned-Independent Tom Ervin had been running, but he withdrew from the race and endorsed Sheheen.

Haley defeated Sheheen again in 2014, as she won nearly 56 percent of the vote to his 41 percent.

Republican primary

Candidates

Declared
 Nikki Haley, incumbent governor

Withdrew
 Tom Ervin, attorney, former state representative and former circuit court judge (ran as an Independent and later dropped out of the race to endorse Vincent Sheheen)

Declined
 Tom Davis, state senator
 Bobby Harrell, Speaker of the South Carolina House of Representatives
 Curtis M. Loftis, Jr., state treasurer
 Glenn F. McConnell, Lieutenant Governor
 Mick Mulvaney, U.S. Representative
 William Walter Wilkins, former Chief Judge of the United States Court of Appeals for the Fourth Circuit
 Alan Wilson, Attorney General of South Carolina

Polling

Democratic primary

Candidates

Declared
 Vincent Sheheen, state senator and nominee for governor in 2010

Declined
 Stephen K. Benjamin, Mayor of Columbia
 Harry L. Ott, Jr., Minority Leader of the South Carolina House of Representatives

Endorsements

Independent and third parties

Candidates

Declared
 Steve French (Libertarian), businessman
 Morgan Bruce Reeves (United Citizens Party), former NFL player and nominee for governor in 2010

Withdrew
 Tom Ervin (Independent), attorney, former Republican state representative and former circuit court judge (endorsed Sheheen)

Declined
 André Bauer (Independent), former Republican Lieutenant Governor of South Carolina, candidate for governor in 2010 and candidate for SC-07 in 2012

General election

Predictions

Polling

With Loftis

With McConnell

Results

References

External links
 South Carolina gubernatorial election, 2014 at Ballotpedia

Official campaign websites
 Nikki Haley for Governor incumbent
 Tom Ervin for Governor
 Steve French for Governor
 Vincent Sheheen for Governor

Governor
2014
2014 United States gubernatorial elections
Nikki Haley